The Last Judgment, Final Judgment, Day of Reckoning, Day of Judgment, Judgment Day, Doomsday, Day of Resurrection or The Day of the Lord (or ) is part of the Abrahamic religions and the Frashokereti of Zoroastrianism.

Christianity considers the Second Coming of Jesus Christ to entail the final judgment by God of all people who have ever lived, resulting in the approval of some and the penalizing of others. The concept is found in all the canonical gospels, particularly in the Gospel of Matthew. The Christian tradition is also followed by Islam, where it is mentioned in the 43rd chapter (Az-Zukhruf) of the Quran, according to some interpretations. Christian futurists believe it will follow the resurrection of the dead and the Second Coming of Jesus, while full preterists believe it has already occurred. The Last Judgment has inspired numerous artistic depictions.

In Christianity

Biblical sources
The doctrine and iconographic depiction of the Last Judgment are drawn from many passages from the apocalyptic sections of the Bible, but most notably from Jesus' teaching of the strait gate in the Gospel of Matthew and in the Gospel of Luke.

Anglicanism and Methodism
Article IV – Of the Resurrection of Christ in Anglicanism's Articles of Religion and Article III – Of the Resurrection of Christ of Methodism's Articles of Religion state that:

Anglican and Methodist theology holds that "there is an intermediate state between death and the resurrection of the dead, in which the soul does not sleep in unconsciousness, but exists in happiness or misery till the resurrection, when it shall be reunited to the body and receive its final reward." This space, termed Hades, is divided into Paradise (the Bosom of Abraham) and Gehenna "but with an impassable gulf between the two". Souls remain in Hades until the Last Judgment and "Christians may also improve in holiness after death during the middle state before the final judgment".

Anglican and Methodist theology holds that at the time of the Last Day, "Jesus will return and that He will 'judge both the quick and the dead'," and "all [will] be bodily resurrected and stand before Christ as our Judge. After the Judgment, the Righteous will go to their eternal reward in heaven and the Accursed will depart to hell (see )." The "issue of this judgment shall be a permanent separation of the evil and the good, the righteous and the wicked" (see The Sheep and the Goats). Moreover, in "the final judgment every one of our thoughts, words, and deeds will be known and judged" and individuals will be justified on the basis of their faith in Jesus, although "our works will not escape God's examination."

Catholicism

Belief in the Last Judgment (often linked with the general judgment) is held firmly in Catholicism. Immediately upon death each person undergoes the particular judgment, and depending upon one's behavior on earth, goes to heaven, purgatory, or hell. Those in purgatory will always reach heaven, but those in hell will be there eternally.

The Last Judgment will occur after the resurrection of the dead and "our 'mortal body' will come to life again." The Catholic Church teaches that at the time of the Last Judgment Christ will come in His glory, and all the angels with him, and in his presence the truth of each one's deeds will be laid bare, and each person who has ever lived will be judged with perfect justice. The believers who are judged worthy as well as those ignorant of Christ's teaching who followed the dictates of conscience will go to everlasting bliss, and those who are judged unworthy will go to everlasting condemnation.

A decisive factor in the Last Judgment will be the question, were the corporal works of mercy practiced or not during one's lifetime. They rate as important acts of charity. Therefore, and according to the biblical sources (Mt 25:31–46), the conjunction of the Last Judgment and the works of mercy is very frequent in the pictorial tradition of Christian art.

Before the Last Judgment, all will be resurrected. Those who were in purgatory will have already been purged, meaning they would have already been released into heaven, and so like those in heaven and hell will resurrect with their bodies, followed by the Last Judgment.

According to the Catechism of the Catholic Church:

The Eastern Orthodox and Catholic teachings of the Last Judgment differ only on the exact nature of the in-between state of purgatory/Abraham's Bosom. These differences may only be apparent and not actual due to differing theological terminology and evolving tradition.

Eastern Orthodoxy

The Eastern Orthodox Church teaches that there are two judgments: the first, or particular judgment, is that experienced by each individual at the time of his or her death, at which time God will decide where one is to spend the time until the Second Coming of Christ (see Hades in Christianity). This judgment is generally believed to occur on the fortieth day after death. The second, General or Final Judgment will occur after the Second Coming.

Although in modern times some have attempted to introduce the concept of soul sleep into Orthodox thought about life after death, it has never been a part of traditional Orthodox teaching, and it even contradicts the Orthodox understanding of the intercession of the Saints .

Eastern Orthodoxy teaches that salvation is bestowed by God as a free gift of divine grace, which cannot be earned, and by which forgiveness of sins is available to all. However, the deeds done by each person are believed to affect how he will be judged, following the Parable of the Sheep and the Goats. How forgiveness is to be balanced against behavior is not well-defined in scripture, judgment in the matter being solely Christ's.

Similarly, although Orthodoxy teaches that sole salvation is obtained only through Christ and his Church, the fate of those outside the Church at the Last Judgment is left to the mercy of God and is not declared.

Icons

The theme of the Last Judgment is extremely important in Orthodoxy. Traditionally, an Orthodox church will have a fresco or mosaic of the Last Judgment on the back (western) wall so that the faithful, as they leave the services, are reminded that they will be judged by what they do during this earthly life.

The icon of the Last Judgment traditionally depicts Christ Pantokrator, enthroned in glory on a white throne, surrounded by the Theotokos (Virgin Mary), John the Baptist, the Apostles, saints and angels. Beneath the throne the scene is divided in half with the "mansions of the righteous", i.e., those who have been saved, to Jesus' right (the viewer's left), and the torments of those who have been damned to his left. Separating the two is the river of fire which proceeds from Jesus' left foot. For more detail, see below.

Hymnography
The theme of the Last Judgment is found in the funeral and memorial hymnody of the Church, and is a major theme in the services during Great Lent. The second Sunday before the beginning of Great Lent is dedicated to the Last Judgment. It is also found in the hymns of the Octoechos used on Saturdays throughout the year.

Lutheranism

Lutherans do not believe in any sort of earthly millennial kingdom of Christ either before or after his second coming on the last day. On the last day, all the dead will be resurrected. Their souls will then be reunited with the same bodies they had before dying. The bodies will then be changed, those of the wicked to a state of everlasting shame and torment, those of the righteous to an everlasting state of celestial glory. After the resurrection of all the dead, and the change of those still living, all nations shall be gathered before Christ, and he will separate the righteous from the wicked. Christ will publicly judge all people by the testimony of their faith – the good works of the righteous in evidence of their faith, and the evil works of the wicked in evidence of their unbelief. He will judge in righteousness in the presence of all and men and angels, and his final judgment will be just damnation to everlasting punishment for the wicked and a gracious gift of life everlasting to the righteous.

Esoteric Christian traditions

Although the Last Judgment is believed by a great part of Christian mainstream churches; the some members of Esoteric Christian traditions like the Essenes and Rosicrucians, the Spiritualist movement, and some liberal instead believe in some form of universal salvation.

Max Heindel, a Danish-American astrologer and mystic, taught that when the Day of Christ comes, marking the end of the current fifth or Aryan epoch, the human race will have to pass a final examination or last judgment, where, as in the Days of Noah, the chosen ones or pioneers, the sheep, will be separated from the goats or stragglers, by being carried forward into the next evolutionary period, inheriting the ethereal conditions of the New Galilee in the making. Nevertheless, it is emphasized that all beings of the human evolution will ultimately be saved in a distant future as they acquire a superior grade of consciousness and altruism. At the present period, the process of human evolution is conducted by means of successive rebirths in the physical world and the salvation is seen as being mentioned in Revelation 3:12 (KJV), which states "Him that overcometh will I make a pillar in the temple of my God and he shall go no more out". However, this western esoteric tradition states – like those who have had a near-death experience – that after the death of the physical body, at the end of each physical lifetime and after the life review period (which occurs before the silver cord is broken), a judgment occurs, more akin to a Final Review or End Report over one's life, where the life of the subject is fully evaluated and scrutinized. This judgment is seen as being mentioned in Hebrews 9:27, which states that "it is appointed unto men once to die, but after this the judgment".

Swedenborgian

Emanuel Swedenborg (1688–1772) had a revelation that the church has gone through a series of Last Judgments. First, during Noah's Flood, then Moses on Mount Sinai, Jesus' crucifixion, and finally in 1757, which is the final Last Judgment. These occur in a realm outside earth and heaven, and are spiritual in nature.

The Church of Jesus Christ of Latter-day Saints
The Church of Jesus Christ of Latter-day Saints (LDS Church) teaches that the last judgment for each individual occurs after that individual has been resurrected. People will be judged by Jesus Christ. Jesus' twelve apostles will help judge the twelve tribes of Israel and the twelve Nephite disciples from the Book of Mormon will help to judge the Nephite and Lamanite people.

The Church of Jesus Christ of Latter-day Saints teaches that people will be judged by their words, their works, their thoughts, and the intents of their hearts. Records that have been kept in heaven and on earth will also be used to judge people. Jesus Christ will act as the advocate for people who had faith in him and such people will enter God's presence based on Jesus' merits as opposed to their own.

After the final judgment, an individual is assigned to one of the three degrees of glory.

Artistic representations

In art, the Last Judgment is a common theme in medieval and renaissance religious iconography. Like most early iconographic innovations, its origins stem from Byzantine art, although it was a much less common subject than in the West during the Middle Ages. In Western Christianity, it is often the subject depicted in medieval cathedrals and churches, either outside on the central tympanum of the entrance or inside on the (rear) west wall, so that the congregation attending church saw the image on either entering of leaving.

In the 15th century it also appeared as the central section of a triptych on altarpieces, with the side panels showing heaven and hell, as in the Beaune Altarpiece or a triptych by Hans Memling. The usual composition has Christ seated high in the centre, flanked by angels, the Virgin Mary, and John the Evangelist who are supplicating on behalf of those being judged (in what is called a Deesis group in Orthodoxy). Saint Michael is often shown, either weighing the deceased on scales or directing matters, and there might be a large crowd of saints, angels, and the saved around the central group.

At the bottom of the composition a crowd of the deceased are shown, often with some rising from their graves. These are being sorted and directed by angels into the saved and the damned. Almost always the saved are on the viewer's left (so on the right hand of Christ), and the damned on the right. The saved are led up to heaven, often shown as a fortified gateway, while the damned are handed over to devils who herd them down into hell on the right; the composition therefore has a circular pattern of movement. Often the damned disappear into a Hellmouth, the mouth of a huge monster, an image of Anglo-Saxon origin. The damned often include figures of high rank, wearing crowns, mitres, and often the Papal tiara during the lengthy periods when there were antipopes, or in Protestant depictions. There may be detailed depictions of the torments of the damned.

The most famous Renaissance depiction is Michelangelo Buonarroti's The Last Judgment in the Sistine Chapel. Included in this fresco is his self-portrait, as St. Bartholomew's flayed skin.

The image in Eastern Orthodox icons has a similar composition, but usually less space is devoted to hell, and there are often a larger number of scenes; the Orthodox readiness to label figures with inscriptions often allows more complex compositions. There is more often a large group of saints around Christ (which may include animals), and the hetoimasia or "empty throne", containing a cross, is usually shown below Christ, often guarded by archangels; figures representing Adam and Eve may kneel below it or below Christ. A distinctive feature of the Orthodox composition, especially in Russian icons, is a large band leading like a chute from the feet of Christ down to hell; this may resemble a striped snake or be a "river of Fire" coloured flame red. If it is shown as a snake, it attempts to bite Adam on the heel but, as he is protected by Christ, is unsuccessful.

In Islam

Belief in Judgment Day ( or ) is considered a fundamental tenet of faith by all Muslims. It is one of the six articles of faith. The trials and tribulations associated with it are detailed in both the Quran and the hadith, (sayings of Muhammad), from whence they are elaborated on in the creeds, Quranic commentaries (tafsịrs), and theological writing, eschatological manuals, whose authors include al-Ghazali, Ibn Kathir, Ibn Majah, Muhammad al-Bukhari, and Ibn Khuzaymah.

Similarities to the Judgement Day of Christianity 
Like Christianity, Islamic eschatology has a time of tribulation preceding Judgement Day where strange and terrible events will serve as portents; there will be a second coming of Jesus (but in different roles); battles with an AntiChrist (Al-Masīḥ ad-Dajjāl, literally "Deceitful Messiah") and struggles with Gog and Magog; and a Rapture-like removal of all righteous believers before the end. A "Day of Resurrection" of the dead (yawm al-qiyāmah), will be announced by a trumpet blast. Resurrection will be followed by a "Day of Judgment" (yawm ad-din) where all human beings who have ever lived will be held accountable for their deeds by being judged by God. Depending on the verdict of the judgement, they will be sent for eternity to either the reward of paradise (Jannah) or the punishment of hell (Jahannam). 
Salvation and damnation
In this process, the souls will traverse over hellfire via the bridge of sirat. For sinners, the bridge will be thinner than hair and sharper than the sharpest sword, impossible to walk on without falling below to arrive at their fiery destination, while the righteous will proceed across the bridge to paradise (Jannah).  

Not everyone consigned to hell will remain there. Somewhat like the Catholic concept of purgatory, sinful Muslims will stay in hell until purified of their sins. According to the scholar Al-Subki (and others), "God will take out of the Fire everyone who has said the testimony" (i.e. the shāhada testimony made by all Muslims, "There is no God but Allah, Muhammad is his prophet") "and none will remain save the kafirun."

Literal or figurative interpretation
While early Muslims debated whether scripture on Judgement day should be interpreted literally or figuratively, the school of thought that prevailed (Ashʿarī) "affirmed that such things as the individual records of deeds (including the paper, pen, and ink with which they are inscribed), the bridge, the balance, and the pond are realities to be understood in a concrete and literal sense."

In Judaism

In Judaism, beliefs vary about a last day of judgment for all mankind. Some rabbis hold that there will be such a day following the resurrection of the dead. Others hold that this accounting and judgment happens when one dies. Still others hold that the last judgment only applies to the gentiles and not the Jewish people.

In Jainism
In Jainism, there is no day of judgement as such. Jains believe, however, that as the 5th era comes to an end, evil will increase and the religion and good will decrease. Only four Jains will remain in the world: a monk, a female monk, a shravak and a shravika, A deity from the heavens will descend upon the earth and gather them, and ask them to take "Anshan", or vow to fast (without any food or water) until death.

In Zoroastrianism

Frashokereti is the Zoroastrian doctrine of a final renovation of the universe, when evil will be destroyed, and everything else will be then in perfect unity with God (Ahura Mazda).

The doctrinal premises are (1) good will eventually prevail over evil; (2) creation was initially perfectly good, but was subsequently corrupted by evil; (3) the world will ultimately be restored to the perfection it had at the time of creation; (4) the "salvation for the individual depended on the sum of [that person's] thoughts, words and deeds, and there could be no intervention, whether compassionate or capricious, by any divine being to alter this." Thus, each human bears responsibility for their own fate, and simultaneously shares in the responsibility for the fate of the world.

Crack of doom
In English, crack of doom is an old term used for the Day of Judgment, referring in particular to the blast of trumpets signalling the end of the world in Chapter 8 of the Book of Revelation. A "crack" had the sense of any loud noise, preserved in the phrase "crack of thunder", and "doom" was a term for the Last Judgment, as Eschatology still is.

The phrase is famously used by William Shakespeare in Macbeth, where on the heath the Three Witches show Macbeth the line of kings that will issue from Banquo: 
"Why do you show me this? A fourth! Start, eyes!
What, will the line stretch out to the crack of doom? 
Another yet! A seventh! I'll see no more."  (Act 4, scene 1, 112–117)

The meaning was that Banquo's line will endure until the Judgment Day, flattery for King James I, who claimed descent from Banquo.

Music
Marc-Antoine Charpentier, Extremum Dei Judicium H.401, Oratorio for soloists, chorus, 2 treble instruments, and bc. (1680)

Giacomo Carissimi, Extremum Dei Judicium, for 3 chorus, 2 violins and organ.

See also

 Apocatastasis
 Atonement in Christianity
 Immanent evaluation, a concept Gilles Deleuze contrasts with transcendent judgment
 Kingdom of God (Christianity)
 List of dates predicted for apocalyptic events
 New Jerusalem
 New World Order (conspiracy)
 Plan of salvation (Latter Day Saints) Mormon view
 Problem of evil
 Ragnarök
 Yom Kippur

References

Notes

Citations

Further reading

External links

 Swedenborg, E. The Last Judgment and Babylon Destroyed. All the Predictions in the Apocalypse are at This Day Fulfilled (Swedenborg Foundation 1951)

Biblical phrases
Book of Revelation
Islamic eschatology
Judgment in Christianity
Judgment in Islam
Judgement
Zoroastrian eschatology